The Hunt for the Truth (German: Die Jagd nach der Wahrheit) is a 1921 German silent drama film directed by Karl Grune and starring Erika Glässner, Fritz Kortner and Rudolf Forster.

The film's sets were designed by the art director Karl Görge.

Cast
Erika Glässner as Claire
Fritz Kortner as Dr. Jack Brinken, court chemist
Rudolf Forster as Untersuchungsrichter
Fritz Schulz as Robert, Claire's brother
Georg H. Schnell as defense lawyer
Ferdinand von Alten as district attorney
Henry Bender as administrator / cabman
Frida Richard as Frau des Verwalters
Margarete Kupfer as neighbour

References

Bibliography
Bock, Hans-Michael & Töteberg, Michael. Das Ufa-Buch. Zweitausendeins, 1992.

External links

Films of the Weimar Republic
Films directed by Karl Grune
German silent feature films
1921 drama films
German drama films
UFA GmbH films
German black-and-white films
Silent drama films
1920s German films